Lust for Life may refer to:

Music
"Lust for Life", a 1990 song by Gamma Ray from Heading for Tomorrow
Lust for Life (Iggy Pop album), 1977
"Lust for Life" (Iggy Pop song), 1977
Lust for Life (Lana Del Rey album), 2017
"Lust for Life" (Lana Del Rey song), 2017
"Lust for Life" (Girls song), 2009
"Lust for Life", a 2009 song by Drake from So Far Gone
"Lust for Life", a 2004 song by Heavenly from Dust to Dust

Other uses
Lust for Life (novel), a 1934 biographical novel about Vincent Van Gogh by Irving Stone
Lust for Life (1956 film), a film based on the novel, starring Kirk Douglas
Lust for Life (1922 film), a German silent romantic comedy film

See also
LFL (disambiguation)